The Embassy of the United States in Lisbon is the embassy of the United States in Portugal, in the capital city of Lisbon. It is located on Avenida das Forças Armadas.

Attacks
On November 24, 1984, the embassy was attacked by four grenades, damaging cars but causing no injuries. It was committed by Marxist terrorists belonging to the Popular Forces 25 April (PF-25) group, calling the embassy an American imperialist threat to Portuguese independence. The next month, four mortar shells were fired by the group at the compound, again only causing damage to cars. On February 19, 1986, a bomb exploded in a diplomat's car at the checkpoint of the embassy compound. The bomb was discovered by the Portuguese guards and managed to run away  just before it detonated and destroyed the vehicle. This attack was also attributed to PF-25.

See also
 List of diplomatic missions in Portugal

References

External links
 Official site

Diplomatic missions in Lisbon
Lisbon
Portugal–United States relations